Henry Clinton Martindale (May 6, 1780 in Berkshire County, Massachusetts – April 22, 1860 in Sandy Hill, Washington County, New York) was an American lawyer and politician from New York.

Life
He graduated from Williams College in 1800. Then he studied law, was admitted to the bar, and practiced at Sandy Hill (now Hudson Falls) from 1801 to 1860. His law office is located in the Hudson Falls Historic District, added to the National Register of Historic Places in 1983.

Among the prospective attorneys who studied law under Martindale's tutelage was Silas Wright.  Martindale was Surrogate of Washington County from 1816 to 1819, and District Attorney from 1821 to 1828.

Martindale was elected as an Adams-Clay Federalist to the 18th, re-elected as an Adams man to the 19th and 20th, as an Anti-Jacksonian to the 21st, and as an Anti-Mason to the 23rd United States Congress, holding office from March 4, 1823, to March 3, 1831, and from March 4, 1833, to March 3, 1835.

He was appointed by Governor William H. Seward as a canal appraiser, holding this post from 1840 to 1843.

He was buried at the Kingsbury Cemetery in Kingsbury, New York.

His son John H. Martindale was a Union Army general and New York State Attorney General.

Notes

Sources

The New York Civil List compiled by Franklin Benjamin Hough (pages 43, 71f, 384 and 419; Weed, Parsons and Co., 1858)

1780 births
1860 deaths
People from Berkshire County, Massachusetts
Democratic-Republican Party members of the United States House of Representatives from New York (state)
New York (state) National Republicans
National Republican Party members of the United States House of Representatives
Anti-Masonic Party members of the United States House of Representatives from New York (state)
County district attorneys in New York (state)
New York (state) state court judges
People from Hudson Falls, New York
People from Kingsbury, New York
Williams College alumni
19th-century American politicians
19th-century American judges